FK Rača is a Slovak football team, based in the town of Rača, near Bratislava. The club was founded in 1925. Club colors are blue and red-black. FK Rača home stadium is Štadión Rača on the street Černockého with a capacity of 4,200 spectators, including 4,000 standees and 200 seats.

Affiliated clubs
The following clubs were or are affiliated with FK Rača :
  Slovan Ivanka pri Dunaji (2022–ongoing)

Current squad 
Updated 5 March 2023

For recent transfers, see List of Slovak football transfers winter 2022–23

Staff

Current technical staff

Historical names
 ŠK Račištorf (1925–38)
 HG / HM Račištorf (1938–45)
 ŠK Račištorf (1945–52)
 TJ Sokol Rača (1953–55)
 TJ Lokomotíva Bratislava–Rača (1962–89)
 ŠK Rača (1990–1997)
 FK Rača (1997–present)

References

External links 

  
 Facebook

Football clubs in Slovakia
Football clubs in Bratislava
Association football clubs established in 1925
1925 establishments in Slovakia